Margaret Sweatman (born 1953) is a Canadian writer from Winnipeg, Manitoba.

Sweatman was educated at the University of Winnipeg, Concordia University and Simon Fraser University.

Her 2001 novel When Alice Lay Down With Peter was a winner of the Rogers Writers' Trust Fiction Prize and the Sunburst Award.

She teaches literature and creative writing, and performs with the Broken Songs Band. With her husband, Glenn Buhr, she won the Genie Award for Best Original Song at the 26th Genie Awards in 2006 for "When Wintertime", a song they wrote for the film Seven Times Lucky.

Bibliography
 Fox (1991), with a newly released edition of the first novel in November 2017.
 Sam and Angie (1996)
 When Alice Lay Down With Peter (2001)
 The Players (2009)
 Mr. Jones (2014)
 The Gunsmith's Daughter (2022)

References

External links
 www.margaretsweatman.com - the official site of the author

1953 births
Living people
Canadian women novelists
Canadian songwriters
Best Original Song Genie and Canadian Screen Award winners
Writers from Winnipeg
Concordia University alumni
20th-century Canadian novelists
20th-century Canadian women writers
21st-century Canadian novelists
21st-century Canadian women writers